M. V. Shreyams Kumar (born 15 April 1967) is an Indian politician and former member of the 12th and 13th Kerala Legislative Assembly, who served from 2006 to 2016 representing the Kalpetta constituency. He is the son of late M. P. Veerendra Kumar, a notable politician from Kerala.

Presently, he is the Managing Director of Mathrubhumi newspaper and former member of Janata Dal (United) party.

Career
He entered politics as the district secretary of Janata Dal (Secular). Later on, he became the secretary general of Yuva Janata, the youth wing of Janata Dal. In 2000, he became the Director of Marketing and Electronic Media of Mathrubhumi newspaper. He was first elected to the Kerala Legislative Assembly in 2006, from Kalpetta constituency, again in 2011 until 2016. He is now the Managing Director of the Mathrubhumi.

Personal life
Shreyams Kumar is the son of M. P. Veerendra Kumar and Usha. He was born in Kalpetta on 15 April 1967. He did his PGDBA from Kings Langley College of Management, London. He is married to Kavitha. They have three daughters and a son.

References

1967 births
Living people
Kerala MLAs 2011–2016
Janata Dal (Secular) politicians
Janata Dal politicians
Janata Dal (United) politicians
Loktantrik Janata Dal politicians
Socialist Janata (Democratic) politicians